Wordfeud is a multiplayer mobile word game developed by Håkon Bertheussen in 2010. Based on the principle of Scrabble, it allows players to play games with up to 30 friends and random opponents simultaneously. It received positive reviews from TechRadar and PCWorld.

By 2011, the game had nearly eight million users worldwide. In July 2020, Norwegian news site Dagens Næringsliv reported that the game had made Bertheussen a multimillionaire.

References

External links 
 

Mobile games
Word games
Scrabble variants